The Groover is an album by organist Jimmy McGriff recorded in 1982 and released on the Jazz America Marketing (JAM) label.

Reception 
The Washington Post's Mike Joyce wrote: "Jazz organist Jimmy McGriff demonstrates on The Groover that no musician has a monopoly on the blues. Certainly not these blues -- the late-night, after-hours kind that once routinely spilled from tired jukeboxes at closing time ... The Groover lives up to its title and a tradition well worth renewing".

Track listing
 "Night Train" (Jimmy Forrest) – 6:30
 "When I Grow Too Old to Dream" (Sigmund Romberg, Oscar Hammerstein II) – 6:00
 "Soft" (Tiny Bradshaw) – 5:43
 "Song for My Father" (Horace Silver) – 4:57
 "Mercy, Mercy, Mercy" (Joe Zawinul) – 5:40
 "This One's for Ray" (Jimmy McGriff) – 8:26

Personnel
Jimmy McGriff – organ, Fender Rhodes piano, piano 
Arnold Sterling – alto saxophone
Billy Butler – guitar
Bob Cranshaw – electric bass
Belton Evans − drums
Ray Mantilla – percussion

References

Jimmy McGriff albums
1982 albums
Albums produced by Esmond Edwards